Theodus Crane (born June 18, 1979) is an American fighter and actor, best known for his roles on The Walking Dead and Underground.

Career

Acting
Crane has had a number of supporting roles in film and television.  His most notable roles are Big Tiny on The Walking Dead, and Zeke on Underground.

Martial arts
Crane is trained in judo, kickboxing, boxing, Filipino martial arts and sanda. He is a two time Amateur World Champion in the World Sanda League.

Filmography

Film

Television

References

External links
 

1979 births
Male actors from Atlanta
American male television actors
American male film actors
American sanshou practitioners
Living people